Emys is a small genus of turtles in the family Emydidae.  The genus (sensu lato) is endemic to Europe and North America.

Species
The following two species may be assigned to the genus Emys (sensu lato).

Nota bene: A binomial authority in parentheses indicates that the species was originally described in a genus other than Emys.

Taxonomy
The eastern North American species, E. blandingii, is usually separated into its own genus, Emydoidea. Similarly, the western North American species, E. marmorata and E. pallida, were recently moved to their own genus, Actinemys.

References

Bibliography

Further reading
Duméril AMC (1805). Zoologie analytique, ou méthode naturelle de classification des animaux, rendue plus facile a l'aide de tableaux synoptiques. Paris: Allais. (H.L. Perronneau, printer).  xxxiii + 544 pp. (Emys, new genus, pp. 76–77). (in French).

 
Turtle genera
Taxa named by André Marie Constant Duméril